Margaret Claire Hoover (born December 11, 1977) is an American conservative political commentator, political strategist, media personality, author, and great-granddaughter of Herbert Hoover, the 31st U.S. president. She is author of the book American Individualism: How A New Generation of Conservatives Can Save the Republican Party, published by Crown Forum in 2011. Hoover hosts PBS's reboot of the conservative interview show Firing Line.

Early life
Hoover was born in Colorado, the daughter of Jean (Williams), a flight attendant, and Andrew Hoover, a mining engineer. She received primary education at Graland Country Day School, an independent co-educational day school in Denver. She earned a B.A. in Spanish literature with a minor in political science from Bryn Mawr College in 2001. She also attended Davidson College for two years, but did not earn a degree there. Along the way, Hoover studied Spanish-language literature and Mandarin Chinese. She also studied abroad in Bolivia, Mexico and China.

After graduating from college, Hoover moved to Taipei where she got her first job as a research assistant and editor in a Taiwanese law firm; she arrived on the day of the September 11 attacks. Quickly realizing she wanted to be back in the U.S., she returned home in 2002.

Career

Public service
Hoover worked for the George W. Bush administration as associate director of Intergovernmental Affairs. She worked on Bush's 2004 reelection campaign and was Deputy Finance Director for Rudy Giuliani's presidential bid in 2006–07. She also worked as a staffer on Capitol Hill for Congressman Mario Díaz-Balart, and as Advisor to the Deputy Secretary at the Department of Homeland Security. Hoover is on the board of overseers at Stanford University's Hoover Institution, and on the boards of the Herbert Hoover Presidential Library Association and the Belgian American Educational Foundation. She served on the advisory council of The American Foundation for Equal Rights and GOProud.

Political beliefs
Hoover is a conservative, with libertarian beliefs on issues of personal morality. Hoover is an advocate for gay rights, including gay marriage, arguing that individual freedom and marriage are conservative values. She has been profiled in The Advocate as "exactly the brand of straight ally we need right now". In 2013, Hoover was a signatory to an amicus curiae brief submitted to the Supreme Court in support of same-sex marriage in Hollingsworth v. Perry.

Hoover is opposed to Donald Trump. Before the 2020 election, she said, "I can't bring myself to vote for Donald Trump", adding that she would "quite likely" vote for Joe Biden instead, as she found the vote a "binary choice".

Political commentator
From 2008 to 2012, Hoover was a Fox News contributor, appearing on Bill O'Reilly's The O'Reilly Factor. In the branded segment "Culture Warrior", she jousted with O'Reilly on a range of topics from entertainment news to popular culture to Hollywood and politics. Since 2012, she has been a political contributor at CNN. In 2014, she hosted the Toyota Solutions Studio at the Women In The World conference held at Lincoln Center, where she interviewed several participants. In April 2018, it was announced she would host Firing Line.

Firing Line with Margaret Hoover (PBS TV Series)
Hoover hosts Firing Line with Margaret Hoover, a relaunch of National Review founder William F. Buckley Jr.'s public-affairs television show, Firing Line. The original show aired on PBS for 33 years, the longest-running public affairs show in television history with a single host. Hoover's show premiered on June 2, 2018, on WNET, which serves the New York metropolitan area, and is the largest PBS market in the country. The New York Times wrote, "Under Ms. Hoover's direction, the discourse is civil and substantive". According to the National Review, "the reincarnation of Firing Line comes at an interesting time, and a needful one". In the runup to the show's premiere Politico said, "It seems like a great idea, so let's test drive it and see what happens". In May 2019, The Algemeiner named Hoover its Journalist of the Year for her work on Firing Line.

Personal life
Hoover is married to fellow CNN contributor John Avlon, a former Rudy Giuliani speechwriter, senior columnist for Newsweek, and former Editor-in-Chief of The Daily Beast. They have a son, Jack, born in 2013, and a daughter, Toula Lou, born in 2015.

Selected works

See also

 New Yorkers in journalism

References

External links

 
 

 
1977 births
Living people
American political consultants
American bloggers
American feminists
American political commentators
Hoover family
Bryn Mawr College alumni
Stanford University people
American LGBT rights activists
George W. Bush administration personnel
Colorado Republicans
CNN people
Fox News people
Wyckoff family
Activists from Colorado
21st-century American women
Conservatism in the United States
Libertarianism in the United States